Fester's Quest (also known as Uncle Fester's Quest) is a video game for the Nintendo Entertainment System based on the 1960s television series The Addams Family. It was released in 1989 in North America and 1990 in Europe.

Story 
One night, a UFO beams up all the residents of the city where The Addams Family lives; this is except for the members of the family, whom Grandmama, the only one to predict the invasion, cast a protective spell on their home beforehand. As the father of the family, Gomez Addams, must continue to guard the home from invaders, it is up to Uncle Fester to use his gun and save the townspeople from the aliens.

Gameplay
Fester's Quest is a shoot 'em up game that takes place in three overhead areas (the streets, the sewers, and the UFO platform) and six buildings where the hallways are viewed from a 3D perspective.

Along the way, Fester encounters other members of the Addams Family in seven houses (plus the Addams mansion via a secret path through the trees behind the mansion): Thing (three times), Wednesday, Gomez, Morticia, Grandmama, and Pugsley, all of whom help him by giving him different weapons and items. Use of one particular item, the Noose, will summon Lurch to destroy all enemies on the screen. The game uses Blaster Master overhead shooter engine.

Fester must travel through the city sewers to reach areas that are otherwise inaccessible due to aboveground obstacles. He may enter certain buildings, which transform the game from its standard overhead view into a 3D mode of play akin to a dungeon crawl. Five of these buildings each house an enormous Alien Boss character, which upon defeat will supply Fester with a puzzle piece and a picture of the alien's UFO, and refill all of his items. After defeating a boss, Fester will leave the building and be unable to backtrack through it to previously visited areas. Once all five bosses are defeated, Fester must board the UFO and defeat one last boss in order to stave off the invasion.

The North American release has a feature that makes Fester's bullets collide with walls and objects, making it more difficult to hit enemies compared to the European release.

Reception

The French magazine Player One stated that Fester's Quest was great for fans of the franchise, although did suffer from short game length, "motley" visuals, and occasional slowdown. Paul Glancey of CVG, on the other hand, dismissed the game for its "flickery and unimpressive" visuals, lack of humor, and "unrewarding" mindless shooting gameplay consisting of constantly-respawning enemies. Critics from Electronic Gaming Monthly felt that while the game had alright graphics and "awesome" and "very good" music, its difficulty was "unbalanced" as it consisted of too-little real action and variety, very-easy mini-quests, and "next to impossible" bosses.

GamesRadar ranked it as the 73rd worst game ever made. The staff criticized its excessive difficulty and lack of comicality. IGN ranked Fester's Quest 45th on its Top 100 NES Games list. Fester's Quest has sold one million copies.

Notes

References

Citations

Bibliography

External links

Fester's Quest at GameFAQs

1989 video games
Alien invasions in video games
Sunsoft games
Nintendo Entertainment System games
PlayChoice-10 games
Run and gun games
The Addams Family video games
Top-down video games
Video games about old age
Video games developed in Japan